Aquichua (possibly from Aymara, jaqhi precipice, cliff, Aymara and Quechua chuwa plate, "cliff plate") is a mountain in the Vilcanota mountain range in the Andes of Peru, about  high. It is located in the Cusco Region, Quispicanchi Province, Marcapata District. Aquichua is situated north east of the lake Sibinacocha and the mountain Chumpe and north of the Yayamari.

See also 
 Quinsachata

References 

Mountains of Peru
Mountains of Cusco Region